"I Am" is a song by American alternative rock band Awolnation. It was released as the second single from their second studio album Run (2015).

Music video
The music video was released on June 29, 2015.

Remixes

Steve Aoki Remix

American DJ and producer Steve Aoki released his remix of "I Am". It was uploaded to his SoundCloud account on June 23 and it was available for free at Red Bull Records' official website.

Mike D Remix

Another remix of the song by American hip hop band Beastie Boys member Mike D was released on November 12. “When I heard ‘I Am,’ it had the anthemic dynamics that we associate with Awolnation. I had a different version in my head of what the song could be, so was happy to be able to manifest that” he quoted.

Track listings
 "I Am" – 4:34

Charts

Weekly charts

Year-end charts

References

Awolnation songs
2015 singles
2014 songs
Red Bull Records singles
Songs written by Aaron Bruno